Ernesto Vieira de Mendonça (born 27 October 1901) was a sailor from Portugal, who represented his country at the 1928 Summer Olympics in Amsterdam, Netherlands and in the O-Jolle event at the 1936 Summer Olympics.

References

Sources 
 

Sailors at the 1928 Summer Olympics – 6 Metre
Olympic sailors of Portugal
1901 births
Portuguese male sailors (sport)
Year of death missing
Sailors at the 1936 Summer Olympics – O-Jolle